The men's 100 metres event at the 2015 European Athletics U23 Championships was held in Tallinn, Estonia, at Kadriorg Stadium on 9 and 10 July.

Medalists

Results

Final
10 July
Wind: 0.0 m/s

Semifinals
9 July

Semifinal 1
Wind: 0.5 m/s

Semifinal 2
Wind: 2.3 m/s

Heats
9 July

Heat 1
Wind: -1.2 m/s

Heat 2
Wind: -1.2 m/s

Heat 3
Wind: -0.8 m/s

Heat 4
Wind: -1.4 m/s

Participation
According to an unofficial count, 32 athletes from 22 countries participated in the event.

References

100 metres
100 metres at the European Athletics U23 Championships